Colwellia piezophila is an obligately piezophilic bacterium from the genus of Colwellia which has been isolated from sediments from the Japan Trench.

References

External links
Type strain of Colwellia piezophila at BacDive -  the Bacterial Diversity Metadatabase

Alteromonadales
Bacteria described in 2004